The Cartecay River is a  river that runs into Ellijay, Georgia in Gilmer County. It is the site of a class II whitewater run.

The Cartecay and Ellijay rivers meet in Ellijay to form the Coosawattee River.  The Cartecay and most of its watershed are located within the southeast corner of Gilmer County, Georgia, but there are small sections of the watershed in Fannin, Pickens, and Dawson counties.

Much of the river runs east to west and is bordered by Georgia State Route 52. The major tributaries are Clear Creek, Licklog Creek, Owltown Creek, Anderson Creek and Tickanetley Creek. The land is mostly undeveloped, but the river passes through some residential developments. The headwaters of the Cartecay River begin in the Chattahoochee National Forest.

References

Rivers of Georgia (U.S. state)
Rivers of Gilmer County, Georgia
Rivers of Fannin County, Georgia
Rivers of Pickens County, Georgia
Rivers of Dawson County, Georgia